Minnesota State Highway 41 (MN 41) is a  highway in Minnesota, which runs from its intersection with U.S. Highway 169 in Jackson Township near Shakopee and continues north to its northern terminus at its intersection with State Highway 7 in Shorewood.

Route description

The route crosses the Minnesota River between Jackson Township and Chaska.

41 is also known as Chestnut Street in Chaska and Hazeltine Boulevard in Chanhassen.

Highway 41 has an intersection with Chaska Boulevard (Old Highway 212) in downtown Chaska.

41 has an interchange with the U.S. 212 freeway in Chaska.

The Minnesota Landscape Arboretum is located immediately west of the junction of Highway 41 and Highway 5 in Chanhassen / Chaska.  The Arboretum entrance is located on Highway 5.

History
Highway 41 was posted in 1934 between U.S. 212 at Chaska and State Highway 7 at Shorewood.

The section of Highway 41 between U.S. 169 at Jackson Township and U.S. 212 at Chaska was authorized in 1950.

The original section of Highway 41 between U.S. 212 and Highway 7 was paved by 1940.

The original Minnesota River bridge between Jackson Township and Chaska opened in 1960. A new four-lane bridge was completed in 2007.

Major intersections

References

041
Transportation in Scott County, Minnesota
Transportation in Carver County, Minnesota
Transportation in Hennepin County, Minnesota
Chanhassen, Minnesota